Pachystachys is a genus of 12 species of flowering plants in the family Acanthaceae, native to rainforest in the Caribbean and Central and South America. They are evergreen perennials and shrubs bearing prominent terminal spikes of flowers with brightly coloured bracts.

The name Pachystachys comes from the Greek for "thick spike", referring to the flower heads. The genus is closely related to Justicia.

The species P. coccinea, P. lutea and P. spicata are found in cultivation. They can be grown outside in subtropical gardens in areas where the temperature does not fall below . Elsewhere, they can be grown under glass or as houseplants.

List of species

References

Acanthaceae
Acanthaceae genera